The waterfront area of a city or town is its dockland district, or the area alongside a body of water.

See also
Belgrade Waterfront
Camden Waterfront
Ipswich Waterfront
Valletta Waterfront
Sabarmati Riverfront

References

External links

Docks (maritime)
Cityscapes
Waterfronts